Stardust in Your Eyes is a 1953 short subject filmed in 3-D, starring night-club comic Slick Slavin and was originally shot to accompany the 3-D feature Robot Monster.

In the short, Slick tells the audience how their favorite stars will look and sound in 3-D, as done in impressions to his own tune, "My Heart Is Owned and Operated by You."  Slavin does impressions of James Cagney, Ronald Colman, Charles Laughton, James Stewart, Sydney Greenstreet, Peter Lorre, and Humphrey Bogart.

External links
Stardust in Your Eyes at IMDB

1953 films
Films directed by Phil Tucker
American robot films
American black-and-white films
1953 short films
1953 3D films
1950s science fiction films
3D short films
1950s English-language films